Bishop's Stortford is an English rugby union team based in Bishop's Stortford, Hertfordshire. The club runs five senior men's sides, a ladies' team, O2 touch rugby section and the full range of mini and junior teams, from under-6's to under-18's. The first XV were promoted to the third tier of the English rugby union system, National League 1 for the first time in season 2017–18.

History
Bishop's Stortford Rugby Football Club was formed in 1920 and has played at its current location at Silver Leys since 1928. When the league system was introduced in 1987 the club was placed in the London 3 tier and won promotion to London 2 North. It took fifteen attempts to win promotion to London 1 in 2003. The club earned promotion to National League 2 South in April 2013. Four years later they gained another promotion, winning the National League 2 South on 22 April 2017, after beating Exmouth 60–7 away. On 30 April 2017, the club recorded its highest attendance, with 1,664  for the final league match of the season against Barnes.

Current standings

Honours & club records
1st team:
 Hertfordshire 7's winners (6): 1965, 1972, 1986, 1994, 1997, 1998
 Hertfordshire Presidents' Cup winners (4): 1972, 1979, 1996, 2009
 London 3 North West champions: 1987–88
 London Division 2 North champions: 2002–03
 National League 3 London & SE champions: 2012–13
 National League 2 South champions: 2016–17

2nd team (Blues):
 Hertfordshire Presidents' Cup winners (4): 2013, 2016, 2017, 2018Colts Hertfordshire Colts Cup winners (12): 1991, 1992, 1995, 1998, 1999, 2004, 2005, 2008, 2009, 2010, 2011, 2014
 National Colts Cup winners (2): 2006, 2013
 National Colts Plate winners: 2011Club records'''
Highest attendance: 1,664 v Barnes on 29 April 2017 in National League 2 South

References

External links
 Official club website

Bishop's Stortford
English rugby union teams
Rugby clubs established in 1920
Rugby union clubs in Hertfordshire